Battle of Jiangling can refer to two battles in the Three Kingdoms period of China:
Battle of Jiangling (208)
Battle of Jiangling (223)